Oherville is a farming commune in the Seine-Maritime department in the Normandy region in northern France.

Geography

History
The name comes is from the Germanic man's name ‘’Odardus’’ and from the Latin ‘’villa’’.

The commune is made up of the union of two hamlets, Oherville, first mentioned in 1240 and Auffray, mentioned in 1040. The existence of a feudal motte indicates the presence of a medieval castle.

The first seigneurs of the place are mentioned in 1170. In the Middle Ages it was a dependency of the Duchy of Longueville. Oherville was a fiefdom under the lordship of Veauville until the 16th century.  The village’s position by the banks of the Durdent led to the construction of mills used for purposes including grinding corn, pressing of oil and the production of linen from flax. Traces of some mills can still be found.

Heraldry

Population

Places of interest
 The church of Notre-Dame, dating from the sixteenth century.
 Auffray manorhouse and its dovecote, dating from the fifteenth century.
 Nonnettes manorhouse, dating from the sixteenth century.
 The remains of the medieval castle.
 The Moulin de Chanterive watermill.

See also
Communes of the Seine-Maritime department

References

Communes of Seine-Maritime
Seine-Maritime communes articles needing translation from French Wikipedia